Saitama, capital of Saitama Prefecture held a mayoral election on May 15, 2005.

Candidates 

 Sōichi Aikawa, incumbent mayor backed by the Liberal Democratic Party (LDP) and Komeito.
 Nakamori Fukuyo, former member of Saitama prefecture assembly, running as an independent.
 Numata Michitaka, supported by the Japanese Communist Party (JCP)

Results

References 
 Results from JanJan 

Saitama (city)
2005 elections in Japan
Mayoral elections in Japan
May 2005 events in Japan